Self-repair may refer to:

Self-repair mechanisms of DNA
Self-healing materials
maintenance, repair, and operations or do it yourself
Self-repair is a linguistic action studied in Conversation analysis

See also
Self-healing
Self-healing (computer science)
Self-healing material
Self-organization (self-organizing systems are capable of self-repair)
Resilience (disambiguation)